The 2000–01 Elitserien season was the 26th season of the Elitserien, the top level of ice hockey in Sweden. 12 teams participated in the league, and Djurgårdens IF won the championship, their most recent championship to date.

Standings

Playoffs

External links
 Swedish Hockey League official site

Swe
1
Swedish Hockey League seasons